

Person of the Year or Man of the Year is an award given to an individual by any type of organization. Most often, it is given by a newspaper or other news outlet to annually recognize a public person. Such awards have typically been awarded to one person, near or after the end of a calendar year. The awardee is usually someone widely known via a news media's audience. A local newspaper typically gives a Person of the Year award to a local individual. However, prominent Person of the Year awards have been given to persons well beyond the scope of a given news market, to animals (Secretariat), to two or more persons in the event of a tie, and to groups of persons whose membership is not clear. Also the award is presented annually by some organizations but may be a one-off or occasional event for others.

The award can be facetious or serious. The chosen person is usually someone who has been notably influential or prominent during the year and could also be a hero or villain. Unlike most awards, it is externally oriented; the award is given to someone who is not a member and may have no association with the awarding organization. 

Variations on the theme include "Business Person of the Year", or "Small Business Person of the Year", or "Entrepreneur of the Year", commonly awarded by local chambers of commerce or other economic boosters. "Woman of the Year" awards are also given. Junior League chapters have long given "Woman of the Year" awards. The Leukemia & Lymphoma Society gives "Man & Woman of the Year" awards to fundraising volunteers locally and nationally in the U.S. each year, terming each dollar raised during a 10-week period to be a vote.

Awards

Person of the Year 
Notable examples include:

 Australian of the Year
 Aviation Week & Space Technology – Vladimir Putin was named person of the year by Aviation Week & Space Technology, an organization that has given the award annually since about 2005.
 Azerbaijan Person of the Year
 Ethiopian Person of the Year
 Financial Times Person of the Year
 Latin Recording Academy Person of the Year
 Le Monde Person of the Year
 MusiCares Person of the Year
 New Zealander of the Year Awards
 The Onions Person of the Year is an award given by The Onion, a satirical website
 Time Person of the Year – interest in nominees and final selection of the Time magazine's Person of the Year award is very prominent in the U.S. news and internationally as well; it is widely covered in other media.

Man of the Year 
 DHL Delivery Man of the Year Award, baseball reliever pitchers
 Hasty Pudding Man of the Year, for entertainers
 IHL Man of the Year, awarded by the International Hockey League
 NBA Sixth Man of the Year Award, basketball
 Railroader of the Year, awarded by Railway Age magazine recognizing contributions to North American rail transport
 Rolaids Relief Man of the Year Award, baseball reliever pitchers
 Walter Payton Man of the Year Award, National Football League

See also 

 Athlete of the Year
 Footballer of the Year (disambiguation)
 Man of the Year (disambiguation), includes numerous films named after the award
 Woman of the Year, 1942 film
 Woman of the Year (disambiguation)

References 

Former disambiguation pages converted to set index articles
Honorary titles